Postelectrotermes militaris (Up-country tea termite) is a species of drywood termite of the genus Postelectrotermes. It is native to India and Sri Lanka. It is a serious pest of tea.

Importance
It is one of major plant pest that attack wide range of economically important plants such as Acacia decurrens, Camellia sinensis, Casuarina equisetifolia, Cedrus sp., Cinnamomum camphora, Cryptomeria japonica, Erythrina subumbrans, Eucalyptus robusta, Grevillea robusta, Stenocarpus salignus, and Tephrosia vogelii. It mainly affects roots and stem parts, and sometimes to whole plant.

Biology
Alates are rare in P. militaris colony. They invade bushes and mainly found in heartwood, never consume on sapwood.

Control
Termites can be removed by crop sanitation and pruning methods. Cultivating disease-resistant crop varieties is also practiced on tea plantations. Besides that, usage of natural pests and pathogens is not effective. Some soil-borne entomopathogens, for example entomopathogenic nematodes such as Heterorhabditis sp., Steinernema carpocapsae and Steinernema feltiae can be effective in natural areas up to some extent.

References

External links
Live-Wood Termites of High Grown Tea and Their Management
The response of the up-country live wood termite (Postelectrotermes militaris, Desneux, (Isoptera:Kalotermitidae) to termite extracts and roots of plants
Species richness, abundance and feeding habits of termites in three montane forest types in the Knuckles Region

Termites
Insects described in 1904
Insects of India